The 2008 ADAC GT Masters season was the second season of the ADAC GT Masters, the grand tourer-style sports car racing founded by the German automobile club ADAC. It began on 10 June at Motorsport Arena Oschersleben and finished on 21 September at Sachsenring after seven double-header meetings. Tim Bergmeister with help of his brother Jörg, Marc Basseng and Frank Stippler clinched the championship title.

Race calendar and results

Standings

Footnotes

References

External links
 
 ADAC GT Masters on RacingSportCars

ADAC GT Masters season
ADAC GT Masters seasons